Beverly John "Bev" Harrison (born May 10, 1942) is a former teacher and New Brunswick politician.

Early life
The son of William and Jean Harrison, Harrison received bachelor degrees in Arts and Education from the University of New Brunswick.

Political career
Harrison was first elected to the legislature in 1978 to represent Saint John-Fundy and was re-elected in 1982.  In 1985, he, and two other Saint John-area MLAs, undertook a caucus revolt calling for the resignation of Premier Richard Hatfield.  Hatfield made some concessions to them and they were re-integrated to caucus.

Harrison was defeated in the 1987 election which saw the Opposition Liberals sweep every seat in the province.  Harrison was again defeated in Saint John-Fundy in the 1991 election.  He did not contest the 1995 election.

Return to teaching
From 1987 to 1997, in private life, Harrison returned to teaching, becoming principal of Saint John High School. He retired from teaching in 1997.

Re-election
In the 1999 election, he was re-elected to the legislature for the riding of Hampton-Kings. He was acclaimed as Speaker on July 6, 1999. Re-elected to the legislature in the 2003 election, he was also re-elected, again by acclamation, as Speaker on July 29, 2003.  He resigned from his post as speaker on February 14, 2006 when he was named to the cabinet as Government House Leader in the Legislative Assembly of New Brunswick and Minister of Supply and Services.

He was re-elected in the 2006 general election, however his party lost and as a result Harrison sat on the opposition benches for the first time in his 15 years in the legislature.

In 2010, Harrison was re-elected with 57% of the vote with his nearest opponent garnering 22%. Harrison announced that he would be seeking the New Democratic Party nomination in the district of Hampton for the 2014 election. Harrison lost the election to Progressive Conservative candidate [Gary Crossman].

References 

1942 births
Living people
Canadian Anglicans
Members of the Executive Council of New Brunswick
People from Hampton, New Brunswick
Politicians from Saint John, New Brunswick
Progressive Conservative Party of New Brunswick MLAs
Speakers of the Legislative Assembly of New Brunswick
21st-century Canadian politicians